The Mansfield school desegregation incident is a 1956 event in the Civil Rights Movement in Mansfield, Texas, a suburb of the Dallas–Fort Worth metroplex.

In 1955, the Mansfield Independent School District was segregated and still sent its black children to separate, run down facilities, despite the Brown v. Board of Education court decision in 1954. Three students brought a suit with the National Association for the Advancement of Colored People.  In Jackson v. Rawdon, the U.S. Fifth Circuit Court of Appeals ruled in favor of the students. In 1956, Mansfield ISD became the first school district in the state ordered by a federal court to desegregate.  The school board approved the measure and allowed Mansfield High School to desegregate. Although other districts in Texas desegregated quietly that fall, the mayor and police chief of Mansfield did not approve of this measure. When school started on August 30, 1956, they joined over 300 whites in front of Mansfield High School. Their goal was to prevent the enrollment of the three black students.  The town turned into complete turmoil as three black effigies were hanged as part of the demonstration.   

Texas Governor Allan Shivers was a noted segregationist and used the power of his office to resist implementation of Brown v. Board of Education. Shivers dispatched Texas Rangers to prevent integration, led by Captain Jay Banks, who, in addition to threatening to arrest Black students, refused to take down an effigy of a Black man hanging by a noose at the entrance of Mansfield High School. Shivers then authorized the Mansfield Independent School District to send its Black students to Fort Worth, Texas. By doing this the school district had effectively ignored a federal court order for integration.

After the transfer of the Black students to Fort Worth, the demonstrations soon ended and order was restored.  It was this success that in 1957 inspired Arkansas Governor Orval Faubus to attempt a similar ordeal in Little Rock, Arkansas. Later that year, Texas passed more segregation laws that delayed integration even further.

Facing the lack of federal funds, the Mansfield Independent School District quietly desegregated in 1965. The decade long defiance of a federal school integration order was one of the longest in the nation during that period.

In June 2020, a statue modeled after Texas Ranger Captain Jay Banks, called One Riot, One Ranger, was removed from Dallas Love Field. It was first dedicated in 1961, 5 years after the Mansfield School Desegregation Incident.

References

Further reading

External links
 Mansfield School Desegregation Incident at the Handbook of Texas Online
 The Crisis at Mansfield, online museum, University of North Texas

Community organizing
History of civil rights in the United States
Civil rights movement
1956 in the United States
Mansfield, Texas
1956 in Texas
1956 protests